The George and Dragon is a grade II* listed public house in Castle Street, Salisbury, Wiltshire, England. It dates from the sixteenth century.

References

External links

http://www.georgeanddragonpub.co.uk/

Grade II* listed pubs in Wiltshire
Buildings and structures in Salisbury
Buildings and structures completed in the 16th century
Saint George and the Dragon